Same-sex marriage is not legal in Israel. The government has registered same-sex marriages performed abroad for some purposes since 2006. However, marriages performed in Israel are only available from one of the 15 religious marriage courts recognized by the state, none of which permit same-sex marriage under their respective auspices. Consequently, Israelis who desire to have their same-sex marriage recognized by the government must first marry outside Israel, in a jurisdiction where such marriages are legal, and then register upon returning home.

In July 2022, the Central District Court ruled that marriages performed under an online civil marriage service established by the U.S. state of Utah are legal in Israel, thereby no longer requiring couples unable to marry in Israel to leave the country. Israel does not recognize civil marriage and "hundreds of thousands of Israelis" are therefore ineligible to marry in the country. An June 2019 opinion poll conducted by Hiddush showed that 78% of Israelis supported recognizing same-sex unions.

Legal history

Background

The religious authority for Jewish marriages is the Chief Rabbinate of Israel, and there are parallel authorities for Christians, Muslims, and Druze, with a total of 15 religious courts. These regulate all marriages and divorces for their own communities. Currently, they all oppose same-sex marriages. If the views of one of these bodies were to change, however, it would be legal for members of that religious community to enter into same-sex marriages in Israel. Same-sex wedding ceremonies without legal significance can be conducted in Israel, which, coupled with legally recognized foreign marriages, allows for both same-sex wedding ceremonies in Israel and legal recognition of same-sex marriages in Israel, on condition that the marriage license comes from another country. The first unofficial municipal wedding took place in August 2009, following the Tel Aviv Pride Parade; five couples were married by Mayor Ron Huldai. The traditional verse for wedding ceremonies from Psalm 137, "If I forget thee, O Jerusalem, let my right hand wither...", was used, but replacing Jerusalem with Tel Aviv, Israel's most gay-friendly city. On 4 June 2019, protesting the inability of same-sex couples to marry in Israel, 23 couples held an unofficial mass wedding ceremony in Tel Aviv.

Israel does not recognize civil marriage. As a result, Israelis not affiliated with any religion, secular Jews not wishing to marry in the rabbinical courts, same-sex couples, and Russian and Ethiopian Jews, many of whom cannot prove their Jewish heritage to the satisfaction of rabbinical authorities, cannot marry in Israel. Many couples go to Cyprus to marry; however, same-sex marriage is not legal in Cyprus, and as a result same-sex couples often travel to Western Europe, Canada or the United States to marry. Despite this fact, unmarried same-sex and opposite-sex couples have equal access to many of the rights of marriage in the form of an "unregistered cohabitation" status, similar to common-law marriage.

Foreign marriages

Same-sex marriages performed abroad in a jurisdiction where such marriages are legal can be recorded with the Administration of Border Crossings, Population and Immigration, according to a November 2006 High Court of Justice ruling which defined such records as strictly "for statistical purposes", thereby avoiding official recognition of same-sex marriages by the state. The case was filed by five male Israeli couples married in Canada who sought recognition of their marriage back home in Israel. The court ruled 6–1 that the government must register same-sex marriages performed abroad. One of the plaintiffs said, "I am glad we won and got what we wanted to achieve in this petition, which was the basic right to be registered as married by the Israeli Ministry of Interior, just as any couple marrying abroad does and takes it for granted." Lawyers for the couples cited a Supreme Court case from 1962 that the government must register civil marriages performed abroad. LGBT advocates welcomed the court decision. It was strongly condemned by Orthodox Jewish politicians, however, including by United Torah Judaism MK Moshe Gafni, who called the ruling "the destruction of the family unit in the state of Israel".

In December 2012, a family court in Ramat Gan granted a married same-sex couple a legal divorce. This was the first decision of its kind, setting a non-binding precedent.

In December 2016, Attorney General Avichai Mandelblit instructed the Interior Ministry to consider applications for citizenship by same-sex and opposite-sex couples equally under the same terms. The same-sex spouse of an Israeli citizen will now be able to claim Israeli citizenship after the same interval as an opposite-sex spouse. Previously, same-sex couples had to wait up to seven years, and would generally only be granted permanent residency rather than citizenship. The process was far easier for opposite-sex couples. The decision came in response to a lawsuit filed with the High Court of Justice by the Israeli Gay Fathers Association.

In June 2020, officials in Tel Aviv-Yafo Municipality announced they would register interfaith and cohabiting same-sex couples as married. Mayor Ron Huldai said the move makes those who register eligible for housing tax discounts as well as easing enrollment of their children in public daycares and schools. The move was widely regarded as a protest against the government's refusal to legalize civil marriage. In November 2020, officials in Ramat Gan made a similar announcement. Mayor Carmel Sharma said the measure had been approved almost unanimously by the city administration, and that it would permit same-sex couples who married abroad to register as married on city documents and be treated on par with married couples for tax and other purposes.

Utah online marriages
As a result of the COVID-19 pandemic, couples unable to legally marry in Israel could not travel overseas to marry because of restrictions on international travel. Around 500 couples decided to marry through an online civil marriage service established by the U.S. state of Utah. The marriage is officiated by Zoom and for an additional fee the couple can obtain an apostille validation stamp for the marriage license provided by Utah state authorities. In June 2021, the Population and Immigration Authority of the Interior Ministry, led by Minister Ayelet Shaked, who is opposed to civil marriage, announced it would not register the marriages, arguing that the weddings were performed in Israel, where there is no provision for civil marriage. Attorney Vlad Finkelshtein rejected this claim, telling The Jerusalem Post that "every aspect of the wedding was performed in Utah, the office of the marriage registrar was in Utah, and that the computer and the IP address from which the ceremony was broadcast were in Utah". The Interior Ministry instructed to freeze the procedure after three marriages were recognized by the Population Authority, prompting dozens of couples to seek legal action.

Judge Efrat Fink of the Central District Court in Lod ruled on 7 July 2022 that the Interior Ministry must recognize all the online marriages. MK Yorai Lahav-Hertzano welcomed the ruling, saying that it "is important and just, and it simply states the obvious – a couple who marries abroad (even via Zoom) must be recognized in Israel. I urge the state not to appeal this ruling." Rabbi Aaron Leibowitz said, "It is unthinkable to me that a country can allow any of its citizens to become dependent on a foreign entity for such a basic need and right as marriage. This is discriminatory, and causes tremendous pain and alienation, not to mention considerable expense. The rabbinate's position portrays a religion obsessed with controlling others even in the most personal of ways." MK Avi Maoz of the extremist Noam party, known for his violent anti-LGBT beliefs and opposing women serving in the Israel Defense Forces, said that the ruling was "ignoring policy that has been in effect for decades. It's unthinkable that judges in Israel undermine the Jewish state and carry out a quiet coup to make Israel a people's state. God willing, this will be rectified soon." Aryeh Deri urged Attorney General Gali Baharav-Miara to intervene and seek a stay of the ruling. The decision means that couples need not leave Israel to marry any longer; they may be wed using the Utah online marriage service and then register their marriage with the state, allowing them to apply for government benefits offered to married couples. The decision was upheld by the Supreme Court on 7 March 2023.

Statistics
In 2018, more than 400 same-sex couples registered their foreign weddings in Israel.

Legislation

In February 2009, MK Nitzan Horowitz introduced a civil marriage bill which included provisions for same-sex marriages. The bill was rejected by the Knesset in May 2012, in a 39 to 11 vote, with 70 MKs not attending.

In March 2010, the Knesset passed the Civil Union Law for Citizens with No Religious Affiliation, 2010. The law allows opposite-sex couples, but not same-sex couples, to form a civil union in Israel if they are both registered as officially not belonging to any religion. In October 2012, the Supreme Court upheld the validity of the law. By 2016, only 121 couples had entered into civil unions.

In June 2013, Hatnuah MKs, led by Justice Minister Tzipi Livni, introduced a bill to establish civil unions in Israel for both opposite-sex and same-sex couples. In October 2013, Yesh Atid MKs, led by Finance Minister Yair Lapid, introduced a similar bill. Meretz MK Zehava Gal-On introduced a civil marriage bill which included provisions for same-sex marriages. On 8 July 2015, the Knesset rejected the civil union bill proposed by Yesh Atid, and the civil marriage bill proposed by Meretz. The Knesset voted 39–50 to reject the two bills. Hatnuah's bill was rejected by the Knesset on 22 February 2016 in a 40–47 vote. A same-sex marriage bill failed in the Knesset in June 2018 by three votes, 42 to 39. The bill's sponsor, MK Stav Shaffir from The Zionist Union, blamed its failure on MKs from the coalition government who promised publicly that they would vote in favor, but instead chose to vote against or abstain from voting. The vote happened shortly after an estimated 250,000 people marched in the Tel Aviv Pride Parade, and an opinion poll found that a majority of Israelis supported same-sex marriage.

In August 2022, Prime Minister Lapid urged the Knesset to legalize same-sex marriage. Citing opinion polls, he said, "If most of the public is with us, why did all our bills on the matters fall or get stuck? Why am I the first Israeli prime minister to arrive at an event for the gay community?" Lapid accused other politicians of being "scared" of supporting same-sex marriage.

Legal challenges
In November 2015, the National LGBT Taskforce of Israel petitioned the Supreme Court to allow same-sex marriage in the country, arguing that the refusal of the rabbinical court to recognize same-sex marriage should not prevent civil courts from performing same-sex marriages. The court did not immediately rule against the validity of the petition. In January 2017, at a public hearing and in its capacity as the High Court of Justice, two justices of the court implied the issue of civil and same-sex marriage was the responsibility of the Knesset, rather than the courts. The court handed down its ruling on 31 August 2017, determining that the issue was the responsibility of the Knesset, and not the judiciary.

Knesset recognition of same-sex partners
After the April 2019 elections and the election of a record five openly LGBT MKs, it was announced that the Knesset would replace the term "husband and wife" with "couple" on all its official documents, and would grant more rights to the partners of LGBT legislators, such as permanent entry passes to the Knesset, authorization to drive Knesset-issued cars assigned to their partners, and invitations to all official ceremonies and events.

Political support
Political parties and alliances represented in the Knesset, as of 2023, that have expressed support for same-sex marriage include Blue and White, the Labor Party, New Hope, Yesh Atid, and Hadash. Some former parties, such as Hatnuah and Kulanu, also supported same-sex marriage. The government sworn in after the 2021 election included a theoretical majority of parties in favour of same-sex marriage: Yesh Atid, Blue and White, Labor, New Hope, and Meretz. However, the government also included socially conservative parties strongly opposed to LGBT rights. In June 2021, Nitzan Horowitz, the leader of Meretz, said the coalition agreement included "a clear commitment to advance the rights of the LGBT community in Israel" and "recognize the status of unmarried couples, including partners of the same sex, as married". The current government includes some far-right, Orthodox Jewish parties which oppose same-sex marriage.

Likud: The party has not taken an official position on the issue. Individual Likud members, such as Limor Livnat, Sharren Haskel, Tzachi Hanegbi, Gila Gamliel, Orly Levy-Abekasis, and Miri Regev, have expressed support for LGBT rights, and one of the party's members, Amir Ohana, the Speaker of the Knesset, is openly gay. Prime Minister Benjamin Netanyahu has not stated a position on same-sex marriage, though he has expressed support for LGBT rights. On the electoral compass devised by Kieskompas for the 2015 election, Likud was categorized as "Tend to agree" with the statement "Same-sex marriage should be legalized". Some Likud members, including Fateen Mulla and Shlomo Karhi, oppose same-sex marriage.
Yesh Atid: The party supports same-sex marriage, and the establishment of civil marriage in Israel. Party leader Yair Lapid strongly supports both. In a survey conducted by Channel 13 ahead of the 2022 elections, 16 of the 17 Yesh Atid MKs said they supported same-sex marriage, with one MK, Elazar Stern, declining to comment.
Shas: Although the party is consistently conservative on matters of religion and state, Shas MK Ya'akov Margi told Jewish Pluralism Watch, in response to its question on LGBT rights, that "Israeli citizens' rights cannot be neglected, no matter what they think and how they behave in their personal lives". In September 2017, Shas MK Yigal Guetta resigned from the Knesset under pressure from rabbis after attending the marriage of his gay nephew.
Blue and White: The political alliance supports LGBT rights. Ahead of the September 2019 election, MK Yair Lapid stated that the alliance would legalize same-sex marriage if it was elected to government. In a survey conducted by Channel 13 ahead of the 2022 elections, 7 of the 8 Blue and White MKs said they supported same-sex marriage, with one MK, Mufid Mari, declining to comment.
Yisrael Beiteinu: Although the party is a supporter of civil marriage in general, it has not taken a clear position on the subject of LGBT rights. On the electoral compass devised by Kieskompas for the 2015 election, Yisrael Beiteinu was categorized as "Tend to disagree" with the statement "Same-sex marriage should be legalized". Party leader Avigdor Lieberman expressed his support for same-sex marriage in 2022.
United Torah Judaism: The party opposes same-sex marriage, and LGBT rights in general.
Religious Zionist Party: The party is socially conservative, and opposes civil marriage and the recognition of same-sex relationships.
Israeli Labor Party: The party supports same-sex marriage. In 2019, the Labor Party made the legalization of same-sex marriage a condition for joining a coalition government. All 4 Labor MKs support same-sex marriage.
Meretz: The party supports same-sex marriage. Leader Tamar Zandberg reiterated the party's support ahead of the April 2019 election. The party's leader from 2019 to 2022, Nitzan Horowitz, is openly gay. In a survey conducted by Channel 13 ahead of the 2022 elections, 5 of the 6 Meretz MKs said they supported same-sex marriage, with one MK, Ghaida Rinawie Zoabi, declining to comment.
Hadash–Ta'al: Although the alliance has no official stance on LGBT rights, leader Ayman Odeh has expressed support for same-sex marriage. Hadash, one of the parties forming the alliance, explicitly supports same-sex marriage.
New Hope: In a survey conducted by Channel 13 ahead of the 2022 elections, 4 of the 5 New Hope MKs said they supported same-sex marriage, with one MK declining to comment.
United Arab List: The party is socially conservative, and opposes LGBT rights.
The Jewish Home: The party opposes same-sex marriage on religious grounds, but is in favor of extending certain rights, such as tax breaks, to same-sex couples.

After U.S. President Barack Obama's endorsement of same-sex marriage in May 2012, Opposition Leader Shelly Yachimovich, Vice Prime Minister Moshe Ya'alon, and many other ministers and parliament members of both the coalition and opposition announced that they agreed. Former President Shimon Peres also expressed his support in 2013. In February 2013, Tel Aviv Mayor Ron Huldai expressed his support for same-sex marriage. In May 2015, following Ireland's legalization of same-sex marriage by popular vote, Huldai reiterated his support, calling on the Knesset to act.

Meretz and Hadash have long had LGBT divisions. In 2009, Kadima became the first major party of the center to establish an LGBT division, and Labor and Likud soon followed suit. Yesh Atid also has an LGBT division.

Public opinion
According to a poll conducted in August 2009, 61% of Israelis supported equal marriage rights for same-sex couples, with 31% opposed. 60% supported joint adoption by same-sex couples, with 34% opposed. A June 2016 poll showed that 76% of respondents supported civil unions or same-sex marriage, including 46% of Religious Zionists and 16% of Haredi Jews.

A Rafi Smith Institute poll conducted in June 2017 asked Israelis: "Do you think same-sex couples should be permitted to marry or have civil unions in Israel?" 79% expressed support for either same-sex marriage or civil unions. When divided by political affiliation, 100% of Meretz and Zionist Union (Labor and Hatnuah) voters were in favour of recognizing same-sex unions, 94% of Yesh Atid voters were in support, 90% of Kulanu voters, 84% of Likud voters, 83% of Yisrael Beiteinu voters, and 65% of The Jewish Home voters. A majority of Shas and United Torah Judaism voters were against recognizing same-sex unions. The margin of error was 4.5%.

A June 2018 survey found that 58% of Israelis were in favour of same-sex marriage. Additionally, 59 Knesset members (MKs) responded to the survey. Of these, 47 expressed support for same-sex marriage, while the remaining 12 expressed opposition. When divided by political parties, all Meretz and Labor lawmakers responded and answered "yes" when asked if they supported same-sex marriage. 4 Likud lawmakers expressed support, while 2 said they were opposed; the remaining did not answer. Kulanu had two supportive MKs, with the rest not responding. The Jewish Home, Shas, and United Torah Judaism together had 5 opposed MKs, and none in favour. The Joint List had two in support, five in opposition, and six who did not answer. No Yisrael Beiteinu lawmaker responded to the survey. LGBT activists subsequently urged the Knesset to act on the issue and legalize same-sex marriage, as "there is broad public support".

An opinion poll conducted by Hiddush and published in June 2019 showed that 78% of Israelis supported same-sex marriage or partnerships. Asked, "In your opinion, should couples of the same sex be allowed to marry or register as partners in Israel?", 78% answered positively, whereas 22% objected to the idea. Broken down by level of religiosity, 93% of secular Jews and 54% of religious Jews expressed support. When asked, "Assuming that same-sex marriages or partnerships are instituted in Israel, do you think that such couples should enjoy all the rights of a married couple consisting of a man and a woman?", 73% were in support, 9% believed only some rights should be granted, while 19% were opposed to any rights. The poll had a margin of error of 4.5%.

See also

LGBT rights in Israel
Recognition of same-sex unions in Asia

Notes

References

Israel
LGBT rights in Israel
Marriage, unions and partnerships in Israel